Ann Agnes Trail or Agnes Xavier Trail (17 February 1798 – 3 December 1872) was a British Roman Catholic nun and artist. She took a leading role in establishing St Margaret's Convent in Edinburgh.

Life
Trail was born in Panbride in 1798. She came from an unusual family in that her great grandfather, grandfather and father had led the same church in Scotland. Trail was educated at home, but in return she had to teach her ten siblings. She was given an 18 month break when she was seventeen but then returned to teaching her brothers and sisters. She did good works and was a teacher at an Irish charity school.

She decided to be an artist and she was taught these skills before 1824. When she set off for Italy in 1826 having already completed commissions for customers in London. She traveled to paint in Florence and Venice but she returned to Rome twice. She had met David Wilkie and others vied for her attention but she saw her future in the Catholic Church after talking with Augustine Baines.

The following years she was back in England where she met Canadian catholic James Gillis in Hammersmith in 1832. He shared his ambition to start a convent and Trail became committed to supporting this plan. The following year she and another Scotswoman entered the Ursuline convent at Chavagnes. Trail became Agnes Xavier and when she returned to Edinburgh in 1834 she was accompanied by two lay sisters and seven French nuns. The convent was established and within months they had enrolled new novices. The original plan had been more ambitious as plans were created for a new Cathedral besides the convent. The whole enterprise was funded by businessperson John Menzies  who gave the land. Although St Margaret's Convent was the first new convent in Scotland it led to a wave of others. Nearly twenty new Scottish convents would be established in the next 50 years.

Tail would paint miniatures in the convent and teach drawing but importantly she socialised with upper and middle class women. She showed that Catholicism could be at home in Scotland.

Trail also created paintings of leading Catholics including Bishop Gillis.

She took a leading role in establishing the St Margaret's Convent in Edinburgh in 1834.

She joined the Catholic church in 1828 in Italy by Cardinal Carlo Odescalchi. Trail was to later paint his portrait.

Death and legacy
She was described as a "unique Presbyterian feminist". She died in 1872 and in 1886 a book was published concerning the history of "her" convent and her autobiography.

References

1798 births
1872 deaths
People from Angus, Scotland
Scottish Roman Catholic religious sisters and nuns
Ursulines